Michkovo is a rural locality (a village) in Argunovskoye Rural Settlement, Nikolsky District, Vologda Oblast, Russia. The population was 57 as of 2002.

Geography 
Michkovo is located 48 km northwest of Nikolsk (the district's administrative centre) by road. Semenka is the nearest rural locality.

References 

Rural localities in Nikolsky District, Vologda Oblast